Big Ten Icons is a television show in the Big Ten Network that showcases outstanding Big Ten athletes and coaches. Its subjects range over a wide period of time and include all sports.

The series began in the fall of 2010 and featured 20 episodes, each one featuring a different Big Ten college athlete counting down in order.

The next season, Big Ten Icons: The Coaches, began in the fall of 2011 and profiled 12 coaches, one from each school, with several from football. Some of the coaches included Nebraska's Tom Osborne, Penn State's Joe Paterno, Iowa's Dan Gable and Michigan's Bo Schembechler.

The series is narrated by college sports broadcaster Keith Jackson.

Episodes

Season 1:

Sponsors
Discover Card is the presenting sponsor of the series.

References

External links

Documentary television series about sports
2010s American documentary television series